Hengchi, officially Shenzhen Hengchi Automobile Trading Co.,Ltd, is a Chinese automobile manufacturer that specializes in developing electric vehicles owned by Evergrande Group.

History 
Hengchi was founded in 2020, and is located in Nansha. There are 9 concept models, all numbered and named Hengchi 1 through Hengchi 9. All vehicles were shown at the Company Event July in 2020, including 4 sedans, 1 MPV, and 4 SUVs.

Vehicles

Current Models 
Hengchi has 9 concept vehicles as of 2021.

References 

Electric vehicle manufacturers of China
Car brands
Car manufacturers of China
Chinese brands